The Birkrigg stone circle (also known as the Druid's Temple or Druids' Circle) is a Bronze Age stone circle on Birkrigg Common, two miles south of Ulverston in the English county of Cumbria. It dates to between 1700 and 1400 BC.

Description 
The circle consists of two rings of stones, the outer measuring 26 m and consisting of 15 stones and the inner being 9 m wide and consisting of 10 stones. None of the stones is more than 0.6m tall.

Limited excavation within the inner circle in 1911 found an upper and lower pavement of cobbles. Below the lower layer of cobbles five cremations were uncovered, three in pits, one on a layer of cobbles and one covered by an inverted urn. A second excavation in 1921 produced a few small stone implements which the excavator thought might be a pestle, a palate and a piece of red ochre, and which might therefore have had a ceremonial use.

References

External links 

Stone circles in Cumbria
Ulverston